Muso Ko is the debut album by Habib Koité & Bamada.
Two tracks, "I Ka Barra" and "Din Din Wo", are included in the Sample Music package included with Windows Vista. The album is available on iTunes.

Track listing
 "Fatma" - 5:01
 "Muso Ko" - 4:36
 "Den Ko" - 5:10
 "Nanalé" - 5:21
 "I Ka Barra" - 5:00
 "Sira Bulu" - 4:41
 "Nimato" - 4:05
 "Cigarette Abana" - 4:21 
 "Din Din Wo" 4:46
 "Kunfe Ta" - 4:53
 "Koulandian" - 4:43

References

1995 debut albums
Microsoft Windows sample music